Miss Venezuela 1965 was the 12th edition of Miss Venezuela pageant held at Circulo Militar in Caracas, Venezuela, on May 27, 1965. The winner of the pageant was María de las Casas McGill, Miss Distrito Federal.

The pageant was broadcast live by RCTV.

Results
Miss Venezuela 1965 - María de las Casas (Miss Distrito Federal)
1st runner-up - Nancy González (Miss Anzoátegui)
2nd runner-up - Thamara Leal (Miss Zulia)
3rd runner-up - Elina Martínez (Miss Miranda)
4th runner-up - Janet Texier (Miss Trujillo)

Special awards
 Miss Fotogénica (Miss Photogenic) - Thamara Leal (Miss Zulia)
 Miss Sonrisa (Best Smile) - Carmen Luisa Cevedo (Miss Yaracuy)

Delegates

 Miss Anzoátegui - Nancy Elizabeth González Aceituno 
 Miss Apure - Socorro Hurtado Omaña
 Miss Aragua - Raquel Bargraser
 Miss Bolívar - Marlene Cipriani Casado
 Miss Carabobo - Maria Elena Moncada
 Miss Departamento Vargas - Vivian Eister
 Miss Distrito Federal - María de las Casas McGill
 Miss Guárico - Evelyn Cipriani Casado
 Miss Lara - Marisol Escalona Abreu
 Miss Mérida - Zaida Vega
 Miss Miranda  - Elina Martínez Fernández
 Miss Monagas - Gisela Gómez Salazar
 Miss Nueva Esparta - Lexis Jiménez Hernández
 Miss Portuguesa - Marisabel Padilla Olivo
 Miss Trujillo - Janet Cristina Texier Torres
 Miss Yaracuy - Carmen Luisa Cevedo Marín
 Miss Zulia - Thamara Josefina Leal

External links
Miss Venezuela official website

1965 beauty pageants
1965 in Venezuela